The Municipality of Radlje ob Dravi is a municipality in Slovenia. It lies in the traditional region of Styria, but belongs to the Carinthia Statistical Region. The seat of the municipality is the town of Radlje ob Dravi.

Settlements
In addition to the municipal seat of Radlje ob Dravi, the municipality also includes the following settlements:

 Brezni Vrh
 Dobrava
 Radelca
 Remšnik
 Šent Janž pri Radljah
 Spodnja Orlica
 Spodnja Vižinga
 Sveti Anton na Pohorju
 Sveti Trije Kralji
 Vas
 Vuhred
 Zgornja Vižinga
 Zgornji Kozji Vrh

References

External links
 
 Municipality of Radlje ob Dravi website
 Municipality of Radlje ob Dravi on Geopedia

Radlje ob Dravi
1994 establishments in Slovenia